Parliamentary elections were held in the Gambia on 25 January 2007. Forty-eight members of the National Assembly were elected, with another five being appointed by the President. The result was a victory for the ruling Alliance for Patriotic Reorientation and Construction (APRC), which won 42 of the 48 seats.

After the elections, President Yahya Jammeh said that "constituencies that voted the opposition should not expect my government's development projects. I want to teach people that opposition in Africa does not pay." He expressed satisfaction with the results and said that "voters have thrown out the two empty barrels from the National Assembly"; this was believed to be a reference to the defeat of two prominent opposition politicians, Halifa Sallah and Hamat Bah. Salleh blamed the opposition's poor performance on a split in its ranks and said that he intended to retire from politics.

Campaign
A total of 103 candidates were approved by the Independent Electoral Commission. The ruling APRC was the only party to contest all 48 seats, and ran unopposed in five constituencies.

Results

References

2007 in the Gambia
Parliamentary elections in the Gambia
2007 elections in Africa
Gambia
Election and referendum articles with incomplete results